Juan David Niño Castiblanco (born 27 June 1988) is a Colombian football manager. He is the current manager of Patriotas.

Career
Born in Tunja, Boyacá, Niño was a sporting director at local side Patriotas before being named assistant manager of Diego Corredor in 2019. On 17 August 2021, he was named manager of the side in the place of Jorge Luis Bernal.

After avoiding relegation, Niño began the 2022 season in charge of the club, but was sacked on 7 February of that year. However, at the end of the year Patriotas confirmed his return to the helm of the first team ahead of the 2023 Primera B championship.

References

External links

1988 births
Living people
People from Tunja
Colombian football managers
Categoría Primera A managers
Patriotas Boyacá managers
Sportspeople from Boyacá Department
20th-century Colombian people
21st-century Colombian people